The Belmont Sessions is an independent production collective based out of Chicago.  They have produced live concert videos for a variety of artists, including RJD2, Maps and Atlases, and Murs. The group focuses on creating and distributing HD content for online audiences. Their videos are on websites such as YouTube and Vimeo  and have been featured on music blogs, such as Pitchfork  and La Blogotheque. The majority of their videos can be viewed on the Belmont Sessions' website.

History

American director, musician and producer, Aunnoy Badruzzaman, created the Belmont Sessions in Chicago, Illinois in 2008. Badruzzaman developed the collective during his second year enrolled at Columbia College Chicago. Originally, the group recorded and produced local musicians out of Badruzzaman's apartment, which was then located off of Chicago's Belmont Avenue. They eventually expanded into working with local venues, as well as touring musicians. The Belmont Sessions is currently active and continues to add to their featured artists.

Mission statement

The Belmont Sessions was founded in order to help unite, promote, and expand music of all genres and styles.

Staff

Aunnoy Badruzzaman (director, DP, Editor, Producer)
Alan Dennison (Editor, Videographer)
Alex Tabaczka (Photographer, Lead Videographer)
Matthew Hoodhood (Videographer)
Brenten Kelly (Videographer)
Dylan Gunnett  (Videographer)
Matthew Pollack (Videographer)
Logan Nielsen (Videographer)
Kevin Monteith (motion graphics)
Elliott Little (Live Sound Engineer)
Zach Perry (Mixing and Mastering Engineer)
Sergio Claudio (Creative Director)

Featured Artists

The Chariot
DJ Heavygrinder
The Juan Maclean
Kiernan McMullan
Maps and Atlases
Murs
Norma Jean
Rachele Eve
Rico Sisney
RJD2
Sidewalk Chalk
Typical Cats

Blog Syndication

The Belmont Sessions' videos have been featured on numerous art and music blogs.
Sites have included:

(Please add alphabetically)

AEMMP Records
Amplifica
Arthurmag.com
Brooklyn Vegan
DotLineCircle
Familiarize Yourself
Folk Radio UK
Indyish
 Jerry Fuchs Memorial Page
Kiernan McMullan Website
Kiernan McMullan Myspace
La Blogotheque
Lotus Sounds
Maps and Atlases Myspace
Modern Culture Vulture
Nervous Acid
On the Right Foot
Pitchfork Media
Prefix Magazine
Rraurl
Schubas
Tenho Mais Discos Que Amigos!
Hitz-Musik.net
The Juan MacLean Blog
Muzzle of Bees

References

External links
http://www.thebelmontsessions.com
http://www.vimeo.com/belmontsessions
https://www.youtube.com/thebelmontsessions
http://www.myspace.com/thebelmontsessions
https://www.facebook.com/thebelmontsessions
https://www.twitter.com/belmontsessions

American video artists